Taskala is a district of West Kazakhstan Region in western Kazakhstan. The administrative center of the district is the selo of Taskala. Population:

References

Districts of Kazakhstan
West Kazakhstan Region